Lieutenant general (abbreviated LTGEN and pronounced 'lef-tenant general') is the second-highest active rank of the Australian Army. It was created as a direct equivalent of the British military rank of lieutenant general, and is considered a three-star rank.

The rank of lieutenant general is held by the Chief of Army. The rank is also held when an army officer is the Vice Chief of the Defence Force, the Chief of Joint Operations, or the Chief of Joint Capabilities. The Chief of Capability Development Group, disestablished in 2016, also carried three-star rank.

Lieutenant general is a higher rank than major general, but lower than general. Lieutenant general is the equivalent of vice admiral in the Royal Australian Navy and air marshal in the Royal Australian Air Force. The insignia for a lieutenant general is the Crown of St Edward above a crossed sword and baton.

Australian Army lieutenants general

The first Australian lieutenant general was Sir Harry Chauvel in 1917.

CGS/CA – Chief of the General Staff and Chief of Army
From 1 January 1909 to 18 February 1997, the most senior Australian Army position was named Chief of the General Staff. The first Australian to occupy this position was Colonel William Throsby Bridges. The first Australian lieutenant general to occupy this position was Sir Brudenell White, from 1 June 1920. Since August 1940, this position, and its successor (Chief of Army), have been held by Australian lieutenant generals.

Chairman, Chiefs of Staff Committee (1958–1965)
In March 1958, the role of Chairman, Chiefs of Staff Committee was created, but with no command authority. This was initially occupied by Lieutenant General Sir Henry Wells (March 1958 – March 1959), and was rotated through the three services, hence (briefly) providing a three-star position available to army officers. In 1968 this became a four-star position. It was replaced in February 1976 by a new position, Chief of Defence Force Staff, with command authority over the Australian Defence Force, and in October 1984 the position was renamed Chief of the Defence Force (CDF) to more clearly reflect the role and its authority.

Vice Chief of the Defence Force (since 1986)
In June 1986, the three-star position Vice Chief of the Defence Force (VCDF) was created. As with CDF, this position rotates between the forces. Lieutenant General John Baker was the first army officer to occupy the position (October 1992 – April 1995).

Chief of Capability Development Group (2003–2016)
A third three-star position, Chief of Capability Development Group (CCDG), which also rotates between the forces, was created in 2003. Lieutenant General John Caligari was the final officer of three-star rank to hold the position before it was disestablished in 2016

Chief of Joint Operations (since 2007)
In September 2007, a fourth three-star position, Chief of Joint Operations, was created.

Equivalents
There are two other permanent three-star positions in the Australian Defence Force, Chief of Navy and Chief of Air Force. There are also a number of other three-star-equivalent positions in the Australian Defence Organisation, but these are all held by civilians.

List of lieutenants general

The following people have held the rank of lieutenant general in the Australian Army:

See also

Australian Defence Force ranks and insignia
Australian Army officer rank insignia
List of Australian Army generals

Notes

References

Army
 
Australian Army
 Australia